The Great Stage Road was a stagecoach route between Nashville, Tennessee and Washington, D.C., beginning in the late 18th century.

References

Historic trails and roads in the United States